Tipula valida is a species of large crane fly in the family Tipulidae.

Subspecies
These two subspecies belong to the species Tipula valida:
 Tipula valida atricornis Alexander, 1940
 Tipula valida valida Loew, 1863

References

Tipulidae
Articles created by Qbugbot
Insects described in 1863